Liolaemus inacayali is a species of lizard in the family  Liolaemidae. It is native to Argentina.

References

inacayali
Reptiles described in 2003
Reptiles of Argentina
Taxa named by Cristian Simón Abdala